Dave Hullfish Bailey (born 1963) is an American sculptor. 

Bailey holds a BA from Carleton College, an MTS from Harvard Divinity School, and an MFA from the Art Center College of Design. He also studied at the Skowhegan School of Painting and Sculpture. He has taught in art, architecture and public practice programs at several universities.

His work was included in the Brisbane Art Design 2019 exhibition. In 2020, his work was included in the Busan Biennale.
In 2018 he received the John Simon Guggenheim Memorial Foundation for Creative Arts, US & Canada. In 2018-19 he was named the Freund Teaching Fellow at Saint Louis Art Museum, Sam Fox School.

References 

1963 births
Living people
20th-century American male artists
20th-century American sculptors
21st-century American sculptors
21st-century American male artists
Carleton College alumni
Harvard Divinity School alumni
Skowhegan School of Painting and Sculpture alumni
Washington University in St. Louis fellows